Alireza Afzal (born 13 April 1974) is an Iranian professional futsal coach and former player.

Honours

Team

Country 
 AFC Futsal Championship
 Champion (1): 1999

Individual

Managerial Club 
 Iranian Futsal Super League
 Champions (3): 2008–09 (Foolad Mahan) - 2012–13 (Giti Pasand) - 2019–20 (Mes Sungun)
 Runner-Up (1): 2011–12 (Giti Pasand)
 AFC Futsal Club Championship
 Champion (1): 2012 (Giti Pasand)
 Runner-Up (1): 2017 (Giti Pasand)

References

1974 births
Living people
Sportspeople from Isfahan
Iranian men's futsal players
Foolad Mahan FSC players
Iranian futsal coaches
Elmo Adab FSC managers
Giti Pasand FSC managers